is a former Japanese football player.

Playing career
Fukushima was born in Nagoya on July 14, 1982. After graduating from high school, he joined the J1 League club Avispa Fukuoka in 2001. However he did not play in anygames and Avispa was relegated to the J2 League at the end of the 2001 season. He debuted in 2002 and played often as forward in 2003. However he did not play as much in 2004. In October 2005, he moved to the Regional Leagues club Rosso Kumamoto. Rosso was promoted to the Japan Football League (JFL) in 2006 and he played more often. In 2007, he moved to the Regional Leagues' V-Varen Nagasaki. In 2008, he scored 25 goals in 18 matches and V-Varen was promoted to the JFL in 2009. In 2011, he moved to the JFL club Kamatamare Sanuki. He retired at the end of the 2011 season.

Club statistics

References

External links

1982 births
Living people
Association football people from Aichi Prefecture
Japanese footballers
J1 League players
J2 League players
Japan Football League players
Avispa Fukuoka players
Roasso Kumamoto players
V-Varen Nagasaki players
Kamatamare Sanuki players
Association football forwards